The Lake Auksi is a lake in Viljandi County, Estonia, near the village of Auksi.

See also
List of lakes of Estonia

Auksi
Viljandi Parish
Auksi